A temporal clause is an adverbial clause of time, that is to say, a clause which informs the reader about the time when the action of main verb of the sentence occurred. So in a sentence such as "after I had said this, he went out", the first clause is a temporal clause. The name comes from the Latin word , genitive , 'time".

Typically in Latin a temporal clause has a conjunction of time such as  "when" or  "after" at or near the beginning of the clause and a verb at the end. But if the clause is part of indirect speech, the verb is nearly always in the subjunctive mood.

The conjunctions used to introduce temporal clauses sometimes have other, non-temporal, meanings. For example,  can mean "when", "since", or "although";  can mean "while", "until", or "provided that";  can mean "when" or "where", and so on.

Another possibility commonly used in Latin for expressing time is a participial phrase.

Temporal clauses are very frequent in certain styles of Latin such as history, and it is not uncommon to find a sentence introduced by two or three temporal clauses, often mixed with participial phrases of time.

Classification of temporal clauses
A common way of classifying temporal clauses is according to whether the action or situation described in the temporal clause is antecedent, contemporaneous, or subsequent to that of the main verb:

A. The action of the temporal clause verb is antecedent to that of the main verb:
The temporal clause describes an event completed before the main verb:
e.g. "after the signal was given, they began fighting"
The temporal clause describes a situation which began before the main verb and which may overlap with it:
e.g. "once the soldiers were in position, the generals came forward"

B. The action of the temporal clause verb is contemporaneous with the main verb:
Two events co-occur:
e.g. "when he fell, he was hurt"
Two situations are co-extensive:
e.g. "he was happy as long as he lived"
The main clause event occurs during the temporal clause situation:
e.g. "they arrived while he was sleeping"
The temporal clause event occurs during the main clause situation:
e.g. "when they arrived he was sleeping"
The main clause situation is interrupted by a temporal clause event
e.g. "he was sleeping, when suddenly they arrived"
The temporal clause defines the start-point of a situation:
e.g. "he had lived there since he was born"
The temporal clause defines the end-point of a situation:
e.g. "he lived there until he died"

C. The action of the temporal clause is subsequent to that of the main verb:

The temporal clause event happened:
e.g. "he left before I arrived"
The temporal clause event did not happen:
e.g. "he left before I had a chance to speak"

A second way of classifying temporal clauses is whether the sentence refers to a definite time, as in the above examples, or is iterative, describing a generalisation or repeated action at an indefinite time:

e.g. "whenever they win, they make a sacrifice"

A third classification is whether the main verb and hence the sentence as a whole is situated in past, present, or future time.

A fourth method of classification, followed in this article, is according to the different conjunctions used.

Choice of conjunction
Roman authors differ from one another in style, and this is shown among other things by their preference for different conjunctions. The table below shows the number of temporal clauses for some of the most common conjunctions in three historians of the republican period, Julius Caesar, Cornelius Nepos, and Sallust, and two poets of the following generation, Virgil and Ovid. The conjunctions are  "when, while",  "after",  "when",  "as, as soon as, when",  "as soon as".

The figures for  here are for clauses of time only, omitting causal or concessive ones.

The table shows that the narrative  with the subjunctive is very common in Caesar and Nepos, but little used by the other three authors. Sallust used  more than any other of the conjunctions, but it was avoided by Nepos. Caesar made relatively little use of  compared with the other authors.

It is rare in poetry, occurring once in Horace and twice in Lucretius only. Conversely,  is hardly found at all in writers of the republican period, but became popular under the empire; in Tacitus it occurs 140 times.

Tense and mood
The tense and mood of the verb used in a temporal clause can affect the meaning. For example,  (pluperfect subjunctive) means "after he came", but  (pluperfect indicative) means "whenever he came". Or again,  (present indicative) means "while he was coming", but  (imperfect subjunctive) means "until he came".

The tense and mood used in a temporal clause may also vary with the conjunction:  ("after he heard") uses the perfect indicative, but  ("when he had heard") uses the pluperfect subjunctive, although the meaning is very similar or identical.

Over the three centuries between 200 BC and 100 AD, the use of the subjunctive in temporal clauses became more common. The conjunction  mostly has the indicative in Plautus, but in Caesar the majority of  clauses have the subjunctive. Iterative clauses (that is, those meaning "whenever...") usually have the indicative in Caesar and Cicero, but from Livy onwards the subjunctive became usual. A similar increased use of the subjunctive can be seen in clauses containing  "while / until" and  "before".

On the whole, temporal clauses use the indicative mood except, unless they are in indirect speech. The main exceptions are the common use of cum with the imperfect or pluperfect subjunctive, and clauses of the type "before X could happen" or "until such time as X might happen" which anticipate some future event.

One difference from English grammar is that in temporal clauses referring to the future (e.g. "when you receive this, write back"), the future or future perfect tense is usually used in Latin where English uses the present. Thus the Latin equivalent is "when you will have received this, write back". In such sentences, if the main verb is an imperative, the future imperative (e.g.  "write (at that time)") is used. The same tenses are used with conditional sentences starting with  "if":

ubi nihil erit quod scrībās, id ipsum scrībitō (Cicero)
"when there is (lit. "will be") nothing to write about, write that fact itself"

sī quid acciderit ... scrībitō (Cicero)
"if anything happens (lit. "will have happened"), write"

Word order

A temporal clause can come before the main clause, after it, or in the middle. It is also possible, in the case of separated , for the main verb to be placed in the middle of the conjunction. In the majority of cases, however, temporal clauses precede the clauses which they modify. This is because the main information which the speaker wishes to communicate, or "focus" of the sentence, tends to be placed second. But if the main information is in the temporal clause (as with  clauses), they come after the main clause.

Quite frequently a topic word precedes the temporal clause conjunction.

 (Cicero)
"when I got there, the governor was taking a siesta"

 (Caesar)
"when they saw this, they changed their plan"

 (Cicero)
"As for Balbus, I haven't seen him since you left"

Sometimes several topic words can precede the temporal clause, as in the following:

 (Cicero)
"when Caesar saw him there, he didn't say anything harsh or unkind"

The verb in the temporal clause usually comes at the end of the clause, although as the examples below show, there are occasional exceptions.

Different conjunctions

The usual meaning is "when", but it can also mean "since/in view of the fact that" or "although/despite the fact that" (concessive ). These meanings can overlap to an extent.

Grammarians usually divide the meanings into two classes: the purely temporal , which takes an indicative mood verb, and the circumstantial , which takes the subjunctive mood. The circumstantial is divided into historical, causal, and concessive uses.

When the meaning is purely of time, in a present or future context, the indicative is usual; in a past context, in the classical period, both subjunctive and indicative are used, but the subjunctive is much more common.

When  has the subjunctive mood, it usually expresses a fact of secondary importance. In such clauses 'the mind of the writer seems always fixed on something farther on, which is of more importance to him". This is known as "circumstantial ".

Historic 

When the tense is imperfect subjunctive, it usually describes a situation already happening when the main action took place. A common way of translating it is "while":

 (Cicero)
"while I was sitting sadly at home, Venerius suddenly came running up"

 (Caesar)
"while the ship was approaching the city, the whole population poured out to find out the news"

 (Gellius)
"when by chance he was making a journey alone, he saw an oak-tree near the road"

With the pluperfect subjunctive, it usually means "after X had happened":

 (Livy)
"after Antiochus had left Egypt, the ambassadors sailed to Cyprus"

 (Caesar)
"after he had said this in a loud voice, he flung himself out of the ship"

 (Cicero)
"after Crassus had said these words, a silence followed"

Imperfect indicative in the main clause
Normally the verb in the main clause after a historic -clause will be either historic present or perfect indicative. However, sometimes the main verb is in the imperfect tense, in which case it describes a situation rather than an event. In the following sentences, the main verb does not describe a pre-existing situation, but a situation which began after the action of the temporal clause:

 (Caesar)
"after he arrived there, he was in great difficulty as to how he could reach the army"

 (Caesar)
"after Caesar arrived in Asia, he began hearing reports that Titus Ampius had been trying to steal money from the temple of Diana in Ephesus"

The following sentence, however, is ambiguous. Some translators interpret it to mean that the situation had already begun when Caesar arrived:

 (Caesar)
"upon his arrival there, he found five cohorts, whom Domitius had detached from the garrison, employed in breaking down a bridge about three miles distant from the town"

An alternative interpretation is that the cohorts began breaking up the bridge after Caesar arrived. In the following sentence, which has  and the pluperfect, the situation is definitely already under way:

 (Nepos)
"for by the time he got there, Agesilaus had already stormed many places and gained possession of a large amount of booty"

When both verbs are imperfect, the situations overlap in time:

 (Caesar)
"while they were retreating into the camp, they kept meeting the enemy who were coming towards them"

Causal 
Frequently, the meaning "when" shades into "since" and gives the cause of the action of the main verb. In some sentences, either interpretation (causal or temporal) is possible, while in others "seeing that" or "since" or "in view of the fact that" is better:

 (Caesar)
"at this point there was fighting for a short time, while/since our men were trying break into the camp, and the others were defending it"

 (Caesar)
"Lucius Petrosidius the eagle-bearer, when/since he was being pressed by a great multitude of enemies, hurled his eagle inside the camp wall"

 (Caesar)
"the Haedui, since they were unable to defend themselves and their property from them, sent envoys to Caesar to ask for help"

 (Caesar)
"since there was a plain between the two camps, Domitius arranged his battle line near Scipio's camp"

When  is causal, it always takes the subjunctive even if it refers to present time:

 (Cicero)
"in view of the fact that these things are so" / "since this is so"

Concessive 
Another, less common, meaning is 'though" or "despite the fact that". The subjunctive is always used:

 (Cicero)
"he did nothing to help me, though (or: at a time when) he could have done"

 (Caesar)
"in this whole battle, though the fight went on from the seventh hour to evening, no one could see the enemy turn their back"

 (Naevius)
"by God, Cupid, although you're so small, you are too powerful!"

Adversative 
Another category of  clause argued for by some grammarians is known as "adversative", in which two situations are contrasted:

 (Caesar)
"but the enemy, as soon as they caught sight of our cavalrymen, of whom the number was 5000, while they themselves had not more than 800 cavalrymen..."

Generic 
Just as the relative pronoun  followed by the subjunctive can have a generic meaning ("the sort of person who..."), so  can also be generic (i.e. "at such a time as..."). In the following sentence the verb after  is imperfect subjunctive:

 (Cicero)
"for he received the farm at one of those times when the prices of estates were low"

In the following, situated in future time, it is present subjunctive:

 (Cicero)
"I'm sure there will come a time when you will desire the services of a great friend"

"Heard someone saying"
In Latin, "I heard him saying" can be expressed as "I heard him while he was saying" (or: "I heard from him while he was saying"), using a  clause with the subjunctive. This turn of phrase is used several times by Cicero:

 (Cicero)
"I heard Metrodorus discussing these very matters"

 (Cicero)
"I have often heard him say that he was not accustomed or able to write them down"

It is also possible to use an accusative and infinitive to express this meaning:

 (Gellius)
"I once heard Valerius Probus say this"

Another way is to use a present participle:

 (Gellius)
I once heard Herodes Atticus giving a lecture in Greek in Athens"

with the indicative
Used with the indicative mood, the conjunction  can mean "at that time when". This is known as 'temporal ".

In the examples below, the events occur at exactly the same time, and the subjunctive could not be used:

 (Cicero) 
"when they are silent, (it is as if) they are shouting"

 (Cicero)
"he was dislodged from his vantage point, (at that moment) when he was driven out of the city"

Clauses like the above are sometimes known as "clauses of equivalent action", since the action of the temporal clause is equivalent to the action of the main clause. The same grammar is used for other actions which occurred at an identical time:

 (Cicero)
"when Sextus Roscius was murdered, they were also there"

 (Cicero)
"surely it is with this (rod) that Romulus marked out the regions of the sky at that time when he founded the city"

In the following, the verbs describe situations which occurred co-extensively and simultaneously. The main verb is perfect indicative, the temporal clause verb is imperfect indicative:

 (Terence)
"thirty days, or more than that, I was in the ship, while all the time I was miserably expecting death"

The following has perfect in the temporal clause, and the imperfect in the main clause:

 (Sallust)
"at that time when Sulla ordered Damasippus and others to be put to death, who was not praising his action?"

In the following, both clauses have the imperfect indicative tense:

 (Cicero)
"the Decii could see the flashing swords of the enemy, at the same time as they were rushing upon their battleline"

 (Cicero)
"I could see it then, when you were speaking"

The following has  with the imperfect indicative, but the perfect indicative in the main clause:

 (Cicero)
"right at the end, just when the defendant was already leaving the province, Carpinatius sent letters to them..."

In other sentences, however, the  clause seems more circumstantial:

 (Cicero)
"I told Gallus, last time I was in Rome, what I had heard"

 (Cicero)
"I was overcome with greatest joy when I heard that you had been made consul"

The following examples, where the context is similar, have  with the subjunctive:

 (Cicero)
"concerning which we had a discussion recently when I was in my villa at Tusculum"

 (Cicero)
"when he heard about his own son, he was heart-broken"

Temporal  with main clause imperfect
In the following examples, the temporal clause describes an event, while the main clause describes a situation which already existed at the time. The temporal clause verb is perfect or historic present indicative, the main clause verb is imperfect indicative:

 (Caesar)
"(at that time) when Caesar came into Gaul, the leaders of one faction were the Aedui, of the other, the Sequani"

 (Cicero)
"when I got there, the governor was taking a nap"

The phrase  "there was a time when" can be followed by indicative or subjunctive; but the subjunctive is more common. The following example has the imperfect indicative:

 (Cicero)
"there was a certain time when people used to roam around randomly in the countryside like wild animals"

While the following has imperfect subjunctive:

 (Caesar)
"there was formerly a time when it was the Gauls who were superior to the Germans in fighting spirit"

of time how long
Another idiom using  is the following, indicating how long a certain situation has persisted. The verb in both clauses is present indicative:

 (Cicero)
"he has owed me money for many years"

 (Cicero)
"amongst the Greeks it is now nearly 500 years that this has been approved of"

 (Gellius)
"we have been searching for it for a long time now"

The length of time can also be expressed using an ordinal number:

 (Cicero)
"it is the twentieth year now that they have been attacking me"

In such sentences the  clause can also have the perfect tense, as in the following example:

 (Cicero)
"it is not yet a hundred and ten years since the law on extortion was passed"

 (Plautus)
"it's less than 15 days since you received 40 minae from Callicles in front of this house"

The following example shows the same type of clause situated in past time, and uses the imperfect indicative and pluperfect indicative tenses:

 (Livy)
"for many years there had been no disputes between the patrician magistrates and the tribunes"

However, the length of time that a situation has gone on can also be expressed without using a  clause. The main verb is present indicative:

 (Cicero)
"he has been living in Lilybaeum for many years now"

 (Cicero)
"for a long time now I've had no idea what you are doing, as you don't write anything"

Iterative 
Clauses which refer to no definite occasion, but to generalised or repeated actions ("whenever..."), usually use the indicative mood; although from Livy onwards the subjunctive mood could also be used. 

In present or indefinite time, if the two events are simultaneous, the present tense is used in both:

 (Caesar)
"they fight almost daily battles with the Germans, whenever they are either keeping them out of their own territory, or themselves fighting in the Germans" territory" 

 (Caesar)
"these, whenever there is need, all take part in the war"

 (Cicero)
"the sort of things which no one dares to tell me when(ever) I'm in Rome"

However, if the temporal clause event precedes the main clause event, the perfect indicative tense is used in the temporal clause:

 (Caesar)
"whenever they win (lit. "have won") a battle, they sacrifice the captured animals"

 (Caesar)
"the Britons call it a "town", whenever they have fortified some dense woodland with a rampart and ditch"

In a past context, if the events are contemporaneous, the imperfect indicative is used in both clauses:

 (Cicero)
"personally, whenever I used to be praised by our friend Cato, I didn't at all mind (lit. "I was easily suffering") being criticised by other people"

But if one event is earlier than the other, the temporal clause has the pluperfect indicative, while the main clause is imperfect:

 (Caesar)
"whenever any cohort left the circle and made an attack, the enemy would retreat very quickly"

 (Cicero)
"it was only when he saw (lit. "had seen") a rose that he used to reckon that spring was beginning"

In authors from the time of Livy onwards, however, the subjunctive is sometimes used in iterative clauses:

 (Livy)
"whenever they saw (lit. "had seen") a debtor being led to court, they used to flock together from all sides"

in a future context
A similar construction is also used in clauses referring to the future, whether or not they are iterative. In future sentences, where English uses a present tense in the temporal clause, the Latin idiom is to use the future tense in both clauses:

 (Cicero)
"I will let you know when (whenever) I have (lit. "will have") some news"

 (Cicero)
"I would like you to write me your plans as soon as you are able (lit. "will be able")"

But the future perfect indicative is used if the event in the temporal clause precedes the main event, as in the famous poem of Catullus describing the number of kisses he will ask for from his mistress Lesbia:

 (Catullus)
"then, after we have made (lit. "will have made") many thousands, we will muddle up the accounts"

 (Cicero)
"I'll write you a longer letter when I've got (lit. "will have got") more free time"

Inverted  clause
In some sentences the circumstances are given in the main clause, while the main event is in the  clause, which always comes second. This is known as "" or an inverted  clause: Here  is followed by a perfect or historic present indicative:

 (Livy)
"Hannibal was already approaching the walls, when the Romans suddenly sallied out against him"

 (Caesar)
"they were already preparing to do this at night, when some married women suddenly ran out into the streets"

 (Virgil)
"scarcely had he spoken these words when suddenly the cloud which had been poured around them parted"

It has been argued that the  kind of temporal clause is an innovation of Latin, not found in other early Indo-European languages.

The following example has the perfect indicative:

 (Caesar)
"as soon as he was able, he hurried to join the army"

Sometimes, however, it takes a subjunctive verb, like the ordinary historic .

 (Caesar)
"as soon as there was beginning to be a sufficient supply of fodder, he came to the army"

The subjunctive is also used if the clause is part of indirect speech. In the following sentence both verbs are in the historic present tense, the first one subjunctive:

 (Caesar)
"he ordered him to set out for the Veneti as soon as he could"

Another meaning, also with the indicative, is "at that time when first":

 (Petronius)
"is she younger than I was when I first slept with a man?"

 (Petronius)
"oh, if only we had those lions which I found here when I first came from Asia!"

"I remember when"
A temporal  clause can be used after  "I remember":

 (Ovid)
"but I remember when that fame was mine!"

 (Cicero)
"I remember the time when you used to seem to me to be lacking in common sense"

 can also be followed by an accusative and infinitive construction, combined with a temporal  clause:

 (Seneca the Elder)
"I remember that he made a long eloquent speech on that occasion when he was led from the prison into the senate"

Alternatively,  can take an accusative and infinitive accompanied by a circumstantial  clause with the subjunctive:

 (Cicero)
"I remember that on one occasion when my father was consul in Macedonia and we were in the camp, our army was disturbed by superstition and fear"

 (Seneca the Elder)
"I remember going into his school at a time when he was just about to recite a speech against Milo"

The present infinitive is used in these last two examples, since the reminiscence is a personal one.

The indicative is used when the clause is more definite ("I remember that time when..."), while the subjunctive is less definite ("I remember a time when" or "I remember one of the times when...").

The combination  sometimes introduces a temporal clause, but more often means "both ... and" or "not only ... but also" or "just as ... so also":

 (Caesar)
"Luck is an important factor in warfare, just as it is in all other matters"



With the perfect indicative
The most common use is when one event followed another, in which case  is usually followed by the perfect indicative:

 (Caesar)
"after Caesar arrived there, he demanded hostages"

 (Cicero)
"after I'd read your letter, your Postumia came to see me"

 (Cicero)
"when he found this out, he was furious"

Time interval mentioned

 (Nepos)
"Hamilcar was killed in the ninth year after he came to Spain."

 (Curtius)
"on the thirtieth day after he had set out from Persepolis, he returned to the same place"

 (Cicero)
"the business was accomplished on the third day after he had spoken"

Rarely,  alone stands for :

 (Suetonius)
"he returned to Rome in the sixth month after he had set off"

 (Cicero)
"on the day after these things were done"

Main verb imperfect
Sometimes the main clause following a  clause is in the imperfect tense. In this case it does not represent a pre-existing situation, but a situation which began or which kept happening after the event in the  clause:

 (Livy)
"after the rout turned in this direction, some of them, shamelessly throwing off their armour, began rushing blindly into the water"

 (Caesar)
"after the Gauls approached nearer, they kept falling into the trenches and getting impaled"

with the imperfect
Sometimes  is followed by an imperfect indicative tense. In this case the temporal clause describes not an event, but a situation which overlaps in time with the action of the main clause, as in the first example below:

 (Livy)
"once the soldiers on both sides were standing drawn up for battle, the generals, with a few of the nobles, came forward into the middle"

Such clauses often imply a spectator ("after he saw that...", "when it became clear that..."); they can also be considered "quasi-causal" ("in view of the fact that..."):

 (Livy)
"in view of the fact that (or "after it became clear that") there was no hope of capturing the camp, he gave the signal to retreat"

 (Cicero)
"after (you saw that) those who were your friends were unable to win, you made sure that those who were winning would be your friends"

A situation in the temporal clause can also be expressed using a pluperfect tense:

 (Livy)
"when (it became clear that) open force had not been successful, the following day they surrounded the defences"

"Since the time when"
The conjunction  or  can also mean "since". In this case the temporal clause describes how long the situation has been going on. When the main verb is negative, the perfect tense is used in the main clause:

 (Cicero)
"I haven't seen Balbus since you left"

If the action is continuous, where English would use the perfect continuous tense, Latin uses the present tense in the main clause:

 (Terence)
"I've been trembling and shivering (lit. "I am trembling and shivering") ever since I caught sight of this woman"

In this kind of sentence,  can be followed by a present tense. In one of Martial's poems, the goddess Venus describes her hold over her lover Mars:

 (Martial)
"ever since he has been (lit. "is") mine, he has never harmed me with a mistress"

It is even possible to have a present tense in both halves of the sentence, as in the following example from a letter to Atticus, in which Cicero complains about how few letters he's been getting since he left Rome:

 (Cicero)
"I tell you, I have been feeling (lit. "I seem to myself") as if I'm completely in exile ever since I've been (lit. "I am") at my villa in Formiae"

"Now that"
Another possible translation in these sentences is "now that":

 (Cicero)
"I used to believe that it was easy, but it's a totally different matter now that I am further away from you"

 (Cicero)
"the paved portico had the greatest elegance, as has now at last become clear to me, now that the portico itself is completely open and the columns have been polished"

The following example, in a past context, uses the pluperfect tense in the temporal clause:

 (Livy)
"now that the enemy had been driven off and there had ceased to be any danger to the walls of Rome, the other consul also left the city"

Future time
 is not used of future time in most classical writers, but is occasionally found in technical writers:

 (Cato)
"make (the oil) on the third day after (the olive) has been picked (lit. "will have been picked")"

(the word for "when?" being ); however, it can also introduce a temporal clause meaning "when" or "as soon as". In poetry, the i is usually short, but occasionally the original pronunciation  with a long i is found:

 (Horace)
"whenever your face has shone on the people, the day goes more pleasantly"

Past event 

 (Livy)
"after he had said this, he struck the piglet with a flintstone"

A subjunctive verb after  may indicate indirect speech, as in the following example, where the subjunctive  indicates that the words "when the signal is given" are part of the order, that is, they indicate when the shout was to be raised, not when the order was given:

 (Livy)
"he ordered them all to raise a shout when the signal should be given"

The main verb following a non-iterative  clause in past time is almost always perfect or historic present. Very rarely, however, it can be an imperfect. In this case, as after  clauses, it describes a situation which is not pre-existing but which arises subsequent to the temporal clause event:

 (Livy)
"when news was brought to Coriolanus that a huge crown of women were present, he was even more obstinate (than he had been on the previous two occasions)"

The main verb can also be a historic infinitive, representing a situation:

 (Tacitus)
"when Sejanus saw that Drusus's death had been unavenged on his murderers, he began to turn over in his mind how he could cause the downfall of Germanicus's children"

Past situation

 (Sallust)
"when dawn was approaching, suddenly he ordered the soldiers to raise a shout and burst out of the gates"

In the examples below  means "after" or "since" ("in view of the fact that") rather than "while":

 (Livy)
"after (it became clear that) no one was coming to meet them, they headed for the camp of the enemy"

 (Livy)
"when he saw that she was obstinate and not moved even by the fear of death, he added disgrace to fear"

"Whenever"
As with other conjunctions, a perfect indicative tense after  may be iterative. Thus in the following example,  does not mean "when I came" but "whenever I come":

 (Terence)
"whenever I come (lit. "have come"), she finds a reason for me to stay there"

In a past context, a pluperfect or imperfect indicative indicates an iterative situation:

 (Sallust)
"whenever there was need for corn, the cohorts used to provide an escort"

 (Sallust)
"having been trained in advance by Jugurtha, the cavalrymen, whenever a squadron of Romans began to chase them, did not retreat in close formation or into one place"

From the time of Livy onwards, however, the subjunctive is also used in iterative clauses.

 (Livy)
"whenever he had said this, he used to throw a spear into their territory"

This use of the subjunctive in temporal clauses of repeated action is generally not found before Livy. But Cicero uses the perfect subjunctive in the following sentence, probably because he is imagining a supposed case rather than a real one:

 (Cicero)
"once someone has perjured himself, he should never be believed again"

When the verb is a generalising 2nd person singular, the subjunctive is regularly used:
 (Sallust)
"a good man gets lazier, if you neglect him"

"Where"
Often a word such as  "place" or  'to that place" in the main clause gives the context for this meaning:

 (Nepos)
"he was buried in the same place where he had laid down his life"

 (Nepos)
"he reached the place where the king was"

The longer form  "wherever" is nearly always used not of time but of place in classical Latin.

 (Seneca)
"wherever the Romans have conquered, they inhabit"



"As soon as, when"
The conjunction  "as", "as soon as" has various meanings; when it introduces a temporal clause it is followed by an indicative mood. It is often followed by a perfect indicative such as  "he saw" or  "he came":

 (Caesar)  
"as soon as Pompey saw that his cavalry had been routed, he left the battle-line"

A common meaning is "as soon as", with another event following immediately:

 (Cicero)
"as soon as he had paid his respects to me yesterday, he immediately set out for Rome"

"As, while"
It can also mean "as" or "while", when followed by the imperfect indicative:

 (Cicero)
"when Hortensius was being led back home from the election ground, he was met by Gaius Curio"

Main verb imperfect
An  clause with the perfect indicative can be followed by an imperfect indicative. Just as when a  clause with the perfect indicative is followed by an imperfect, the imperfect describes a pre-existing situation:

 (Petronius)
"when I got home, my soldier was lying in bed"

"As" (manner)

 (Caesar)
"as we showed earlier"

 is not used in sentences in future time.

The word  usually means "in whatever way", but there are a few places where it is used in a temporal sense to mean "whenever", as in this hymn to the Muses:

 (Horace)
whenever you are with me, I will willingly attempt the raging Bosporus as a sailor"



Past context
When the sentence refers to a single occasion in the past, the tense in the temporal clause is perfect indicative, as in the following examples:

 (Cicero)
"as soon as he was ordered to go into exile, he obeyed"

 (Nepos)
"as soon as he caught sight of the enemy, he did not hesitate to join battle"

 (Cicero)
"as soon as he touched the province, Verres sent a letter from Messana"

Sometimes  alone is used, as in the following example:

 (Caesar)
"as soon as our men stood on dry land, they attacked the enemy"

Future context
The future perfect can be used in reference to future time. Here Cicero writes to his friend Atticus:

 (Cicero)
"I shall send the book to Varro as soon as I have seen you, if you approve"

 (Cicero)
"as soon as I have decided, I will write to you"

Iterative
In the following example, which describes the character of Alcibiades, the pluperfect and imperfect tenses are used in the temporal clause in an iterative sentence in past time:

 (Nepos)
"when the occasion demanded, he could be hardworking and put up with hardship...; but as soon as he had relaxed and there was no particular reason to make an effort, he was given over to extravagance, dissolute living, lust, and intemperance"



"While"
When  means "while this was happening", explaining the background circumstances of the action in the main clause, it tends to be followed by the present indicative, even in a past context:

 (Livy)
"while these things were being done (lit. are being done) in Rome, both consuls were waging war amongst the Ligurians"

 (Cicero)
"while this was going on, meanwhile Cleomenes had arrived at the shore of Pelorus"

 (Cicero)
"while I was on the way back, Hortensius had come"

In the following example,  "she fled" is perfect tense, but  "she is fleeing", with a short u, is present tense:

 (Ovid)
"(Thisbe) fled into a cave, but while she was fleeing (lit. "is fleeing"), her cloak slipped off her back and she left it behind"

However, other tenses are sometimes possible, such as the perfect in the following example:

 (Cicero)
"I learnt this while I was in Capua"

The following has the pluperfect:

 (Livy)
"while the contest had turned away the eyes and minds of the enemy in one direction, the wall was captured using ladders"

In the following the imperfect indicative is used:

 (Nepos)
"while the sacrifice was being carried out, he asked me whether I would like to set out with him for the camp"

A clause with  can also be iterative:

 (Cicero)
"whenever I am reading, I tend to agree (with what is written)"

 with the present indicative can also be used in a future context. Pliny the Younger pleads with a sick friend to write frequently:

 (Pliny)
"for while I'm reading your letters I will feel relieved, but whenever I have finished reading them I will immediately be afraid again"

"while" with the subjunctive
In republican Latin, the verb in a  clause, just as with other temporal clauses, was changed into the subjunctive mood when in indirect speech (imperfect subjunctive in a past context, present subjunctive in a present or future context). 

 (Sallust)
"everyone was eager that he should be noticed while performing such an exploit"

 (Nepos)
"he left the princes in charge of that bridge, while he was away" (i.e. until he got back) 

However, in Tacitus, there are some exceptions, when the present indicative is retained.

In some authors also, such as Livy and later writers, as well as poets such as Virgil,  can take the same construction as circumstantial , even when not in indirect speech, using the imperfect subjunctive:

 (Virgil) 
"while she was fleeing from you, she failed to see a snake in the grass"

"As long as"
The imperfect indicative after  usually means "as long as X was happening", referring to two situations which happened at an identical time:

 (Cicero)
"this nation was brave as long as Lycurgus's laws were in force"

In the above example, the perfect indicative tense  "it was" implies that the period of Sparta's greatness is now over.

In the following, both clauses have the imperfect indicative tense:

 (Cicero)
"nor, during that time I was with you, could you see my soul"

 (Caesar)
"as long as the Gauls were at a distance from the fortifications, they were producing a greater effect with the superior number of their weapons"

Other tenses can be used, such as the future indicative in both halves of the following example:

 (Cicero)
"Gracchus will continue to be praised for as long as the memory of Roman history remains"

The following has the present indicative in both halves:

 (Cicero)
"it is said that as long as there is life, there is hope"

In the following, both tenses are perfect indicative:

"we hoped for those things, as long as fortune was with us"

 (Caesar)
"for as long as it was possible to fight on equal terms, a few men withstood a large number of enemy"

"Until"
The conjunction  can also mean "until". In the following, it is used with the present indicative:

 (Terence)
"think about this until I get back"

More frequently in this meaning it is followed by the subjunctive. In sentences of this kind there is often an idea of "waiting for something to happen":

 (Plautus)
"the wolf kept watch until the dogs were dozing"

 (Plautus)
"don't expect me to return home by this same road"

 (Nepos)
"while the murder was being carried out (i.e. until the business could be completed), he was far away on guard duty"

 (Livy)
"Verginius waited until he had a chance to consult his colleague"

 (Cicero)
"you write that you are intending to stay in Italy until a letter for you arrives from me"

"Provided that"
Another meaning with the subjunctive is "as long as" in the sense "provided that" ( may also be used in this meaning):

 (Accius)
"let them hate, provided that they fear"

The negative in such provisional clauses is :

 (Cicero)
"if I seem to have been a bit lazy, I'm not worried, so long as I don't seem that way to you"

"Until"
In the following example, referring to a future situation, it is followed by a future perfect tense:

 (Terence).
"I will not stop until I have finished this"

Referring to the past, the perfect indicative may be used:
 (Livy)
"using the knife he forced his way, until he reached the gate"

 (Livy)
"the Thracians did not move at all, until the Romans had crossed"

 (Livy)
"he ordered Spurius Larcius to stand at the Colline Gate until the enemy passed by"

 (Gellius)
(he said) they sit there and wait nearly until midday, until their pupils have had a chance to sleep off all their wine of the night before"

 (Celsus)
"until it scars over, it should be kept in a bandage"

"While, as long as"
From the Augustan period onwards it can also mean "while" or "as long as":
 (Horace)
"as long as I was pleasing to you ... I flourished more blessed than the king of the Persians"

 (Livy)
"as long as they were retreating still armed and packed together, it was the infantry's task to pursue them"

In the above examples, the imperfect tense is used in the temporal clause, since it describes to a situation, but the perfect tense is used in the main clause, as is usual in Latin when the length of time a situation lasted is given.

In the following example, referring to the future,  is followed by a future perfect:

 (Plautus)
"I don't request to be released until he gets back here"

In this example it is followed by a pluperfect indicative:

 (Lucretius)
"with horrifying cries they would call for Death, until cruel agonies had deprived them of life"



"As long as"
The word  can have a non-temporal meaning ("to the extent that", "as far as"), but it can also be used in a temporal sense, meaning "as long as". When referring to the past it is regularly followed by the perfect indicative tense:

 (Caesar)
"as long as he was able, he put up a very brave resistance"

 (Cicero)
"as long as Pompey was in Italy, I didn't give up hope"

"Until"
Another meaning is "until":

 (Cicero)
"Milo had been in the senate on that day up until the time when the senate was dismissed"

When referring to the future, just as with  clauses, the future or future perfect tense is used where English has a present tense:

 (Cicero)
"I shan't stop asking until I hear (lit. "it will have been reported to us") that you have done it"

In the following sentence, the pluperfect subjunctive is used, as if the sentence is reported speech ("I will stay until I have learned"), known as "virtual ":

 (Caesar)
"he himself decided to stay in Gaul until he had learnt that the winter-quarters had been fortified"

When referring to the past, it is frequently followed by a perfect indicative:

 (Nepos)
"he stayed in one place, for as long as it was winter"

It can also refer to the present, with the present tense:
 (Curtius)
"for as long as it flows inside the walls, (the river) retains its name"

In the following example, the tense is future:
 (Cicero)
"you will learn for as long as you wish"

In the following, the imperfect indicative is used:
 (Pliny)
"this is how a man should grow old, who has devoted himself completely to the republic for as long as was fitting"

The original meaning is "how long?" or "how long...!", and this meaning is also found.

The adverb  means "how often" or "as often as"; but it can also be used as a conjunction meaning "whenever", as in the following example:

 (Plautus)
"whenever I want to go out, you hold me back"

Cicero often writes  in this meaning. In the following example, the verb is in the perfect tense:

 (Cicero)
"I made sure I was present every time there was a meeting of the senate"

As with other conjunctions which mean "whenever", Livy tends to use the subjunctive in iterative clauses:

 (Livy)
"while I was away, whenever I remembered my country, all these things used to occur to me"

The word  is often interrogative ("when?") but sometimes, especially in early Latin, it can be a temporal conjunction. It is usually followed by an indicative verb:

 (Plautus)
"he changes his appearance whenever he feels like it"

In other sentences, the meaning shades into "seeing that" or "since":

 (Plautus)
"since/when I have lots of relatives, what need do I have of children?"

The iterative form  is used by some authors, but it is rare:
 (Celsus)
"whenever the fever hasn't appeared, it is safe to take a bath"

 can also be an adverb meaning "one day (whenever that may be)", as if  is short for :
 (Ovid)
"but if the gods see these things, ... one day you will pay me the penalty"

The conjunctions  (or ) and  both mean "before". After a negative verb in the main clause, they can be translated with "until". Both are very common, although some authors prefer one (for example, Caesar almost always uses ). Very rarely  is found. Another similar conjunction is  "on the day before".

This is especially so if the priority is emphasised as in the following example:

 (Caesar)
"(he said that) he had come to Gaul earlier than the Roman people (had done)"

The separation is also common in negative sentences:

 (Apuleius)
"they don't go away until they have written something"

Past reference
However, some sentences use the perfect indicative, especially those which are negative, such as the following:

 (Caesar)
"and they did not stop fleeing until they reached the river Rhine"

 (Livy)
"and they showed no sign of war until they actually invaded"

 (Cicero)
"he did not dare to return the account books to the treasury until Dolabella had been condemned"

Sometimes the verb is indicative even in an affirmative sentence:

 (Cicero)
"you came angry with everyone; which I realised and foresaw as soon as I saw you, before you began to speak"

When the sentence mentions a time interval, the use of the indicative more likely:

 (Cicero)
"this happened when I was praetor, in the fifth year before I became consul"

 (Cicero)
"shortly before he died, he had handed over everything to Heraclius"

 (Cicero)
"on the day before I reached Athens he had already departed for Mytilene"

However, there are also types of sentences where the subjunctive is required even in the republican period, for example where one action is done with the hope of preventing another:

 (Caesar)
"he quickly put a fortification round the hill before it could be noticed by the enemy"

Similarly, the subjunctive is used if the meaning is "before there was a chance for something to happen":

 (Cicero)
"before I could say anything, he got up from his chair and departed"

 (Livy)
"many died in the fire before they noticed the arrival of the enemy" 

The following has the pluperfect subjunctive:

 (Cicero)
"then came Serapion with your letter; even before I had opened it, I told him that you had written to me about him previously"

Another reason for the subjunctive is if there is an idea of insistence ("he refused to leave before conquering..."):

 (Nepos)
"and he did not depart from there until he had conquered the entire island"

The subjunctive became more common, and in authors from the time of Livy onwards it is used often without any particular justification. For example, in the following sentences, the relation is purely temporal: 

 (Livy)
"it was two hundred years before they captured the city of Rome that the Gauls crossed into Italy"

 (Suetonius)
"before he left the province, he entered upon a plan of appalling atrocity"

Generalising present

 (Seneca the Elder)
"we see a flash before we hear the sound"

The following generalisation shows the present subjunctive after  contrasted with the present indicative after :

 (Martial)
"it's hard to say no when you are asked, Sextus,but even harder before you are asked!"

Sometimes, however, the perfect indicative may be used in a generalisation, as in the following:

 (Cicero)
"we use our limbs before we learn (lit. "we have learnt") for the sake of what purpose we have them"

When the main verb is negative, the perfect indicative is regular:

 (Cicero) 
"until earth is (has been) thrown onto a bone, the place where it was cremated is not holy"

Future reference
Referring to the future, a simple present indicative can be used in the temporal clause in sentences such as the following:

 (Cicero)
"before I return to the subject, I will say a few words about myself"

 (Plautus)
"before I go, is there anything you want to ask me?"

The future simple is not used in these clauses. However, the future perfect is used if the main verb is negative:

 (Cicero)
"I shall make no counter-arguments until he has spoken (lit. "before he will have spoken")"

 (Cicero)
"I can't decide anything for sure until I see you (lit. "I will have seen you")"

Indirect speech
In indirect or reported speech, the subjunctive is used in the temporal clause. However, in the following sentence the verb  is understood from the context, and only an ablative absolute remains:

 (Livy)
"they said that would not return from there until the enemies" city had been captured"

Commands and wishes
The subjunctive is usual if the main verb is an imperative:

 (Cicero)
"if you love me, do it before you leave"

 (Livy) 
"before you step outside this circle, give your response"

But the following has the indicative:

 (Plautus)
"give me a kiss before you go"

The subjunctive may also be used if the main verb is itself subjunctive, expressing a wish:

 (Plautus)
"I'd like to meet this neighbour before I go home"

However, the following wish has the present indicative in the temporal clause:

 (Virgil)
"may the Father Almighty drive me to the shadows with a thunderbolt / before I violate you, o Modesty!"

Temporal clause equivalents
As well as temporal clauses, Latin has other ways of expressing the time of the main action in a sentence, and which can substitute for a temporal clause.

Participle phrases
A participle phrase, or a simple participle, is often used as the equivalent of a temporal clause in Latin. Not every type of temporal clause can be replaced by a participle.

Present participle

 (Cicero)
"Plato died while he was writing"

The participle can be in any case, depending on whichever noun it agrees with. In the following sentence, it is in the genitive case:

 (Curtius)
"while (Clitus) was saying this, (the king) stabbed him in the side with the spear"

Literally "he pierced with a spear the side of him (as he was) saying these things".

Perfect participle

 (Nepos)
"after being sent to help the people of Orchomenus, he was killed by the Thebans"

Ablative absolute
When the phrase is in the ablative case, as in the example below, it is known as an ablative absolute. Such phrases most commonly use the perfect participle, but the present participle can also be used:

"when he learnt of Caesar's arrival (lit. "with Caesar's arrival learnt of"), Ariovistus sent envoys to him"

 (Horace)
"you too will become one of the noble springs, when I speak of the ilex-tree placed over your hollow rocks"

 (Cicero)
"and I have no doubt that by the time you read this letter, the business will have been completed"

In view of the lack of a present participle of the verb  "I am" in Latin, sometimes an ablative phrase alone, without a verb, can stand for a temporal clause:

 (Nepos)
"when I was a small boy"

After a preposition
A participle phrase can sometimes follow a preposition of time:

 (Plautus)
"make sure you come before the sun has set"

 (Livy)
"these are the things that were done at home and on campaign in the first year after the kings were expelled"

Verbal nouns
Some verbal nouns, such as  "arrival" and  "return", can be used in phrases of time:

 (Caesar)
"on his arrival, the Bituriges sent envoys to the Aedui to ask for help"

 (Caesar)
"Afranius had gathered nearly all the corn in Ilerda before Caesar's arrival"

Relative clause
The ablative relative pronoun  "on which" can be used to mean 'the day on which" or 'the time at which", and thus introduce a quasi-temporal clause, as in the following examples from the historian Curtius. The pluperfect subjunctive is used, as the clauses are included in a sentence of indirect speech:

 (Curtius)
"but he began shouting that the very moment he'd heard he had run to report the matter to Philotas"

 (Curtius)
"and again he kept on asking how many days it had been (lit. 'the how-many-eth day it was") since Nicomachus had brought the accusation to him"

The feminine  is similarly used to refer to a night:

 (Petronius)
"on that night, on which they got married"

 (Tacitus)
"on the night when the legion was setting off"

Coordination

 (Virgil)
"he had spoken, and now the fire was heard along the walls more loudly"

Multiple temporal clauses
Temporal clauses and participial phrases standing for temporal clauses are especially common in historical writing. Nutting cites the following typical example from Julius Caesar, where a temporal clause with cum is placed between two participle phrases:
 (Caesar)
"the Germans, having heard the shouting behind them, when they saw their comrades being killed, having cast down their weapons ... threw themselves out of the camp."

In Nepos comes this sentence with a temporal clause, an ablative absolute, and a main verb:
 (Nepos)
"whom when the barbarians saw that he had escaped the fire, by throwing missiles at him from long range, they killed"

Livy also writes sentences containing a mixture of participial and temporal clauses. The following sentence has four participles or participial phrases, a cum clause, and a postquam clause, followed by the main verb:
 (Livy)
"where, having been welcomed politely by those who were ignorant of his plan, when after dinner he had been led into the guest bedroom, burning with love, after everything seemed safe round about and everyone seemed to be asleep, having drawn his sword, he came to the sleeping Lucretia"

 (Cicero)
"as soon as I reached my villa at Arpinum, after my brother had joined me, at first our conversation (and it was a long one) was about you"

Allen and Greenough cite this sentence from Livy, which consists of two temporal clauses, and no fewer than six perfect participles:

 (Livy)
"the Volsci, the small hope they had in arms every other hope having been cut off, after they had made trial of (it), apart from other difficulties having also joined battle at a place unsuitable for fighting and even more unsuitable for fleeing, when they were being slaughtered on all sides, after turning from fighting to prayers, with their commander surrendered and their weapons handed over, having been sent under the yoke, with a single garment each, full of ignominy and disaster, they were allowed to depart."

These long sentences, in which a number of subordinate clauses and participle phrases are followed by a main verb, are known as "periods".

Bibliography
Bennett, Charles Edwin (1895). Latin Grammar, Boston; pp. 187–191.
Gildersleeve, B. L. & Gonzalez Lodge (1895). Gildersleeve's Latin Grammar. 3rd Edition. (Macmillan); pp. 359–376.
Greene, John (1907). "Emphasis in Latin Prose". The School Review, Nov., 1907, Vol. 15, No. 9, pp. 643–654.
Greenough, J. B. et al. (1903). Allen and Greenough's New Latin Grammar for Schools and Colleges. Boston and London; pp. 350–359.
Hullihen, Walter (1911a). "A Chapter from an Unpublished Latin Syntax, with Prefatory Discussion". The Classical Weekly, Vol. 4, No. 25 (Apr. 29, 1911), pp. 194–196. (A discussion of  clauses.)
Hullihen, Walter (1911b). "A Chapter from an Unpublished Latin Syntax, with Prefatory Discussion (Concluded)". The Classical Weekly, Vol. 4, No. 26 (May 6, 1911), pp. 203–205.
Kennedy, Benjamin Hall (1871). The Revised Latin Primer. Edited and further revised by Sir James Mountford, Longman 1930; reprinted 1962; pp. 184–186.
Lewis, C. T. & Short, C. (1879). A Latin Dictionary.
Nutting, H. C. (1916). "Where the Latin Grammar Fails". The Classical Weekly, Vol. 9, No. 20 (Mar. 18, 1916), pp. 153–157.
Nutting, Herbert C. (1920). "Notes on the Cum-Construction". The Classical Journal, Vol. 16, No. 1 (Oct., 1920), pp. 26–33.
Nutting, H. C. (1933). "On the History of the Cum-Construction". The American Journal of Philology, Vol. 54, No. 1 (1933), pp. 29–38.
Petersen, Walter (1931). 'The Evidence of Early Latin on the Subjunctive in Cum-Clauses". Classical Philology, Oct., 1931, Vol. 26, No. 4, pp. 386-404.
Schlicher, J. J. (1909). 'the Temporal Cum-Clause and Its Rivals". Classical Philology Vol. 4, No. 3 (Jul., 1909), pp. 256–275.
Smith, W. & Hall, T. D. (1871). English-Latin Dictionary. 
Steele, R. B. (1910). "Relative Temporal Statements in Latin". The American Journal of Philology, 1910, Vol. 31, No. 3, pp. 265–286.
Viti, Carlotta (2013). 'The idiosyncrasy of the cum inversum and of Latin subordination'. In: Bodelot, Colette; Gruet-Skrabalova, Hana; Trouilleux, François. Morphologie, syntaxe et sémantique des subordonnants. Clermont-Ferrand: Presses universitaires Blaise Pascal, pp. 115-130.
Woodcock, E.C. (1959), A New Latin Syntax, (Bristol Classical Press), pp. 172–195.

References

Latin grammar
Clauses